Yevgeny Viktorovich Sadovyi (born 19 January 1973) is a retired Russian freestyle swimmer who won three gold medals at the 1992 Summer Olympics at Barcelona and was subsequently chosen by Swimming World magazine as the Male World Swimmer of the Year.

Career
Born in Volzhsky, Volgograd Oblast, Sadovyi started swimming at the age of six. In 1981, his family moved to Volgograd, and two years later, young Yevgeny started to train for the international competitions.

In 1991, at the European Championship in Athens, Yevgeny Sadovyi was a gold medallist in the 400 m and 4×200 m relay, both freestyle.

In 1992 at Barcelona, the 19-year-old Sadovyi revealed as the strongest swimmer of the Olympic games, winning three gold medals and setting two world records in the 400 m freestyle and 4×200 m freestyle relay for his team. He missed the Giorgio Lamberti's world record in the 200 m freestyle race by a 0.01 second, but cut 1.47 seconds off Kieren Perkins' record in the 400 m, beating the same Australian swimmer.

In 1993, Sadovyi was second in the 200 m freestyle at the European Championship in Sheffield, plus two other golds in freestyle relays. He retired in September 1996 to work as a swimming coach, first in his native Volgograd, then in Moscow, with the national team, and later in Libya. His trainees include Sergey Ostapchuk and Yekaterina Kibalo.

In 1996, Sadovyi graduated from an Olympic school and later from the State Institute of Sport, both in Volgograd.

Personal bests
In long-course swimming pools Sadovyi's personal bests are:

200 m freestyle: 1:46.70
400 m freestyle: 3:45.00

See also
 List of members of the International Swimming Hall of Fame
List of multiple Olympic gold medalists at a single Games
World record progression 400 metres freestyle

References

1973 births
Living people
People from Volzhsky, Volgograd Oblast
Russian male freestyle swimmers
Soviet male freestyle swimmers
World record setters in swimming
Olympic swimmers of the Unified Team
Swimmers at the 1992 Summer Olympics
Olympic gold medalists for the Unified Team
European Aquatics Championships medalists in swimming
Medalists at the 1992 Summer Olympics
Olympic gold medalists in swimming
Sportspeople from Volgograd Oblast